Saquon Rasul Quevis Barkley (born February 9, 1997) is an American football running back for the New York Giants of the National Football League (NFL). Prior to entering the NFL in 2018, Barkley played college football at Penn State, where he set several all-time school records for his offensive production over three seasons before foregoing his senior year to enter the NFL.

In 2017, Barkley finished fourth in Heisman Trophy voting with 304 total votes, third in Maxwell Award voting, and received multiple national and Big Ten Conference awards and recognition. During Barkley's three-year collegiate career, he set all-time Penn State records for most all-purpose career yards (5,538), most career rushing touchdowns (43), most career receiving yards by a running back (1,157), most rushing yards by a freshman and sophomore, and most total yards in a single game. 

Barkley was selected second overall by the Giants in the 2018 NFL Draft, setting several NFL and team records en route to making the 2018 Pro Bowl and being named the NFL Offensive Rookie of the Year. He confronted injuries in the 2019 and 2020 seasons, but was again named to the Pro Bowl in 2022.

Early years
Barkley was born in The Bronx, where he grew up a New York Jets fan idolizing Curtis Martin, the Jets' running back from 1998 until 2006. Barkley comes from a family of athletes. His father Alibay was a boxer, his brother Alibay Jr. was a baseball player drafted by the Los Angeles Angels, and his great uncle Iran Barkley was a professional boxer.

In 2001, Barkley and his family moved to Bethlehem, Pennsylvania in the Lehigh Valley region of eastern Pennsylvania in search of a safer and more suburban environment. The family later moved to neighboring Allentown and, in 2005, to Coplay, Pennsylvania.

High school
Barkley attended Whitehall High School in Whitehall Township, Pennsylvania, which competes in the Eastern Pennsylvania Conference, an elite division of large high schools in the Lehigh Valley and Poconos known nationally for producing an abundant number of NFL and other professional athletes.

At Whitehall High School, Barkley rushed for 3,646 yards with 63 touchdowns from his sophomore to senior year, including 1,856 yards and 31 touchdowns as a senior. Barkley was rated as a four-star recruit and committed to Penn State to play college football. He originally committed to Rutgers before changing to Penn State.

In addition to football, Barkley also lettered in basketball and track and field at Whitehall. As a senior in 2015, he won Eastern Pennsylvania Conference gold medals in both the 100-meter dash (11.15 seconds) and in the long jump (22'2.5" or 6.77m) at the PIAA District 11 meet, where he also earned a second-place finish in the 100-meter dash with a time of 10.90 seconds, which set a Whitehall High School record. Later in the track and field season, Barkley set personal best marks of 46'2.5" (14.08m) in the shot put and 6'0" (1.83m) in the high jump.

Barkley was considered a top NCAA Division I football prospect and received multiple football scholarship offers, including from Missouri, North Carolina, Notre Dame, Ohio State, Pitt, Rutgers, Syracuse, and Temple. He chose to accept an offer from Penn State.

On September 10, 2021, Whitehall High School retired Barkley's jersey number (#21). Prior to retiring Barkley's Whitehall jersey number, the high school had retired the jersey numbers of two other Whitehall alumni who went on to have successful NFL careers: Matt Millen, who played from 1980 until 1991 with the Oakland and Los Angeles Raiders, the San Francisco 49ers, and the Washington Redskins; and Dan Koppen, who played from 2003 until 2013 with the New England Patriots and Denver Broncos.

College career

Freshman year
At Penn State, Barkley earned immediate playing time as a true freshman in 2015. After rushing for one yard on one carry during his first game, he rushed for 115 yards with a touchdown in his second game against Buffalo. He followed up that performance by rushing for 195 yards and two touchdowns on 21 carries in his third game against Rutgers. In October, he missed two games due to injury.

In his first game back against top-ranked Ohio State on October 17, 2015, he rushed for 194 yards on 26 carries. During his freshman year at Penn State in 2015, Barkley rushed for 1,076 yards on 182 carries.

During the offseason, Barkley received praise for his freshman year performance and was awarded second-team All-Big Ten with some votes for first team status and being named BTN.com Freshman of the Year.

Sophomore year

In the first game of his sophomore year at Penn State in 2016, Barkley rushed for 105 yards and a touchdown in a 33–13 win over Kent State. In week two, in a renewed rivalry game against Pitt, Penn State trailed in the second quarter 28–7 before Barkley led Penn State back, scoring five touchdowns with his fifth coming with 5:00 left in the fourth quarter, to bring the Nittany Lions within three points. However, quarterback Trace McSorley threw an interception in the Pitt end zone with 1:41 left that denied the Nittany Lions' hopes of completing the comeback. In week five against Minnesota, in what would become a recurring theme for the 2016 Penn State football team, Penn State again was forced to come back from a halftime deficit. In overtime, after being held to only 38 yards on 19 carries during regular playing time, Barkley's first play in overtime, a 25-yard touchdown run, gave Penn State the victory.

In week six against Maryland, Barkley had his first ever 200-yard rushing game at Penn State, finishing with 31 carries for 202 yards and one touchdown. In week seven, in a matchup versus Ohio State, Barkley rushed for 99 yards on 12 carries with one 37 yard run in a 24–21 win over the second ranked Buckeyes. In week eight, Barkley and no. 24 Penn State scored a season high 62 points versus Purdue as Barkley rushed for a career-high 207 yards and a career-high long 81 yard run, along with 70 yards in receiving yards and two touchdowns, giving him a total of 277 yards in the game. Penn State defeated Purdue 62–24 and improved to 6–2 and 4–1 in Big Ten play.

On November 1, 2016, Barkley was named a semi-finalist for the Maxwell Award, granted to the all-around best collegiate football player of the year. On November 5, Barkley rushed for 167 yards and a touchdown against Iowa. He added 44 yards and another touchdown in receiving for a total of 211 all-purpose yards in Penn State's 41–14 victory.

After the regular season, Barkley was named the Big Ten Offensive Player of the Year, Ameche–Dayne Running Back of the Year and First Team All-Big Ten.

On December 3, 2016, Barkley had 19 carries for 83 yards, rushed for a touchdown, and caught another touchdown on a wheel route. His efforts helped Penn State recover from a 28–7 deficit to stun Wisconsin, 38–31, in the 2016 Big Ten Championship Game.

In the 2017 Rose Bowl on January 2, Barkley had 25 carries for 194 yards, averaging 7.8 yards per carry, including a 79-yard rushing touchdown that gave Penn State a 28–27 lead. After trailing 13–0, Penn State scored seven touchdowns on seven consecutive possessions, including four touchdowns on four consecutive offensive plays, including Barkley's 79-yard touchdown. Barkley scored the first, fourth, and seventh touchdowns for Penn State, giving the Nittany Lions a 49–35 lead in the fourth quarter, though USC ultimately went on to win the game, 52–49.

At the close of his sophomore year at Penn State, Barkley had set Penn State records for most rushing yards in a season by a freshman (1,076) and by a sophomore (1,496).

Junior year
In the first game of the 2017 season against Akron, Barkley ran 14 times for 172 yards, two rushing touchdowns, and a long run of 80 yards. He also caught two passes for 54 receiving yards. For his efforts, Barkley was named co-Big Ten Offensive Player of the Week.

In Penn State's 2017 Big Ten opener, at Iowa, Barkley led Penn State to a 21–19 win, recording 358 all-purpose yards. He also set a school record for most all-purpose yards in a single game, recording 211 rushing yards, a rushing touchdown, 94 receiving yards, and 53 kick return yards. For his efforts, Barkley was again named Big Ten Offensive Player of the Week.

In the first Big Ten home game of his junior year against the Indiana, Barkley rushed 20 times for just 56 yards, an unusually underwhelming rushing day for him. Despite this, he still had a major impact on the game, returning the opening kickoff 97 yards for a touchdown, catching four passes for 52 yards, and throwing a 16-yard pass to receiver DaeSean Hamilton late in the fourth quarter to cap a 45–14 Penn State win. This made Barkley the first player in Big Ten history to record a return and passing touchdown in the same game. Barkley was named Big Ten Special Teams Player of the Week. One month later against Ohio State, Barkley again returned the opening kickoff back 97 yards for a touchdown, but was limited for the rest of the game recording 44 rushing yards on 21 carries, 36 of which came on a touchdown run in the second quarter. In his final collegiate game at Penn State, Barkley rushed for 137 yards and scored two touchdowns, one of them a 92-yard effort to put Penn State up 28–7 over the Washington Huskies in the 2017 Fiesta Bowl, which Penn State went on to win 35–28. On December 31, 2017, following Penn State's Fiesta Bowl victory, Barkley declared his intention to forgo his senior year at Penn State and enter the 2018 NFL Draft.

College statistics

Collegiate awards and honors
 Fiesta Bowl champion, 2017
 Six-time Big Ten Offensive Player of the Week, 2017, 2016
 ESPN and Sporting News Midseason All American – 2017
 Two-time Big Ten Special Teams Player of the Week (2017)
 Paul Hornung Award, 2017
 Consensus All-American, 2017
 Sporting News All-American First team, 2017
 ESPN First Team All-American, 2017
 FWAA First Team All-American, 2017
 Associated Press First Team All-American, 2017
 Walter Camp First Team All-American, 2017
 Big Ten Offensive Player of the Year 2016 and 2017
 Big Ten Running Back of the Year, 2016 and 2017
 Big Ten Return Specialist of the Year, 2017
 Big Ten champion, 2016
 Associated Press Third Team All-American, 2016
 Sporting News All-American second team, 2016
 All-Big Ten First team, 2016
 All-Big Ten Second team, 2015

Records
Penn State:
 Most career rushing touchdowns: 43
 Most rushing yards by a freshman: 1,076 yards
 Most rushing yards by a sophomore: 1,496 yards
 Most total yards in a single game: 358 yards (vs. Iowa)
 First player to score a return and passing touchdown in the same game

Professional career

Entering the 2018 NFL draft, Barkley was widely projected to be a top 10 NFL pick. In the weeks leading up to the NFL Combine, Barkley's stock rose even higher. By late February 2018, some mock drafts projected him as high as the second selection overall, the highest for a running back since Reggie Bush in 2006. ESPN analyst Mel Kiper Jr., who has history of not supporting the selection of running backs in the NFL draft's first round, said "Barkley is a once in a lifetime talent; teams that pass on this young man will be sorry."

At the combine, Barkley had a performance that was widely praised, running a 4.4 second 40-yard dash and doing 29 bench presses of 225 pound weight, tying for the most reps by any running back at the combine. According to NFL analyst Ian Rapoport, the Cleveland Browns were "strongly considering" drafting Barkley first overall, which would have made him the first running back since Ki-Jana Carter in 1995 to be selected first overall. 

Barkley was selected by the New York Giants with the second overall selection in the 2018 draft. On July 22, 2018, Barkley signed a four-year rookie contract, worth $31.2 million fully guaranteed.

2018 season

Barkley scored his first NFL touchdown, a 68-yard rush, in the season opener against the Jacksonville Jaguars. Overall in his first NFL game, he rushed for 106 yards and scored a touchdown in the Giants' 20–15 loss. The following week, in a 20–13 loss to the Dallas Cowboys, Barkley recorded 14 receptions, setting a Giants' all-time franchise record for most catches in a game. He also tied the NFL single game record for most catches in a game by an NFL rookie. In Week 3, in the Giants' 27–22 victory over the Houston Texans, Barkley recorded 82 rushing yards, rushed for a touchdown, and caught five passes for 35 receiving yards. The following week, in the Giants' loss to the New Orleans Saints, Barkley recorded 100 scrimmage yards with 44 rushing yards and 56 receiving yards and a rushing touchdown. In Week 5, against the Carolina Panthers, he recorded four receptions for 81 receiving yards and two receiving touchdowns and rushed for 48 yards in the Giants' 33–31 loss. 
In the Giants' Week 6 Thursday Night Football game against the Philadelphia Eagles, Barkley finished with 130 rushing yards, including a 50-yard touchdown and 99 receiving yards, totaling 229 all-purpose yards in the Giants 34–13 loss to Philadelphia. In Week 11 against the Tampa Bay Buccaneers, Barkley rushed for his NFL career-high to date with 142 yards and three touchdowns as the Giants won 38–35. and for his efforts he was named the NFC Offensive Player of the Week. In Week 12's 25–22 loss to the Philadelphia Eagles, Barkley rushed for 101 yards and scored a 51-yard touchdown, becoming the first player since John Fuqua in 1970 to rush for two 50-plus yard touchdowns against the Eagles in a single season. In Week 13 against the Chicago Bears, Barkley had 125 rushing yards and three receptions for 21 yards in the 30–27 overtime win.

During Week 14, in the Giants' 40–16 win over the Washington Redskins, Barkley rushed for 170 yards, including a 78-yard touchdown, becoming the first Giants rookie to surpass 1,000 rushing yards in a season, and setting the franchise's single-season record for rookies with 15 touchdowns scored. In the regular season finale against the Dallas Cowboys, Barkley had 17 carries for 109 yards, his seventh game with over 100 rushing yards on the season, and he scored a touchdown in the Giants' 36–35 loss. In recognition of his rookie season accomplishments, Barkley was elected to the 2019 Pro Bowl, where he helped the NFC win the Skills Showdown.

Barkley received numerous awards during and after his rookie season,  including Pepsi Rookie of the Year, FedEx Ground NFL Player of the Year, AP NFL Offensive Rookie of the Year and was named to the PFWA All-Rookie Team and AP All-Rookie teams.

2019 season

Entering his second NFL season, Barkley was ranked No. 16 on the NFL's Top 100 players for 2019. Barkley was chosen by his teammates as one of seven team captains for the 2019 season, an honor rarely bestowed on players after only one year on the team.

In Week 1 against the Dallas Cowboys, Barkley rushed 11 times for 120 yards, including a 59-yard run, in the Giants' 35–17 loss. In this game, he fumbled the ball for the first time in his NFL career. In Week 2 against the Buffalo Bills, Barkley rushed 18 times for 107 yards and a touchdown and caught three passes for 28 yards in the Giants' 28–14 loss to Buffalo. In Week 3 against the Tampa Bay Buccaneers, Barkley suffered a high ankle sprain and was expected to miss four to eight weeks. Barkley made his return from the injury in Week 7 against the Arizona Cardinals. In the game, Barkley rushed 18 times for 72 yards and a touchdown in the Giants' 27–21 loss. In Week 8 against the Detroit Lions, Barkley rushed for a season-high 19 times and 64 yards and caught a season-high eight passes for 79 yards and a touchdown in the team's 31–26 loss. In Week 15 against the Miami Dolphins, Barkley rushed 24 times for 112 yards and two touchdowns and caught four passes for 31 yards in the Giants' 36–20 win. In Week 16, Barkley rushed for a career high 189 yards on 22 carries and caught four passes for 90 yards and two total touchdowns in a 41–35 win over the Washington Redskins. He won the NFC Offensive Player of the Week award for his performance in Week 16. In Week 17 against the Philadelphia Eagles, Barkley rushed 17 times for 92 yards, including a season-long 68-yard run that resulted in a touchdown, during the Giants' 34–17 loss to Philadelphia. Barkley finished his sophomore season as the only running back in Giants' history to have 1,000 rushing yards in their first two seasons. He was ranked 31st by his fellow players on the NFL Top 100 Players of 2020.

2020 season
In Week 1 against the Pittsburgh Steelers on Monday Night Football, Barkley rushed 15 times for six rushing yards and caught six passes for 60 receiving yards in the Giants' 26–16 loss to the Steelers. Barkley's 0.4 yards per attempt was a career low. During the following week's 17–13 loss to the Chicago Bears, Barkley was carted off the field after suffering a knee injury, which was later diagnosed as a torn anterior cruciate ligament, which ended his 2020 season. During the game, Barkley rushed to the right and engaged with Bears safety Eddie Jackson, who wrestled him down to the ground near the sideline at the end of a six-yard run. Barkley immediately grabbed the back of his right knee and removed his helmet. Jackson later voiced his concern on Twitter, sending prayers and support. Barkley was placed on injured reserve on September 22, 2020.

2021 season

On April 28, 2021, the Giants picked up the fifth-year option on Barkley's contract, worth a guaranteed $7.217 million for the 2022 season. In Week 5 against the Dallas Cowboys, Barkley's foot landed on Jourdan Lewis and his ankle rolled. On November 3, 2021, the Giants announced that Barkley was being placed in the NFL's COVID-19 protocol. In the 2021 season, Barkley had 593 rushing yards, two rushing touchdowns, 41 receptions, 263 receiving yards and two receiving touchdowns in 13 games.

2022 season
Against the Tennessee Titans in Week 1, Barkley rushed for 164 yards, a touchdown, and caught six passes for 30 yards in the 21–20 comeback win. He converted the go-ahead two point conversion late in the fourth quarter. Barkley's performance on Sunday resulted in him receiving the NFC Offensive Player of the Week. In Week 3, Barkley had 126 scrimmage yards and a rushing touchdown in the 23–16 loss to the Dallas Cowboys. In Week 4, Barkley had 146 rushing yards in the 20–12 victory over the Chicago Bears.

2023 season
On March 7, 2023, the Giants placed the non-exclusive franchise tag on Barkley.

NFL career statistics

Regular season

Play-offs

Awards and honors
 2× Pro Bowl – 2018, 2022
 Pepsi NFL Rookie of the Year – 2018
 FedEx Ground Player of the Year – 2018
 NFL Offensive Rookie of the Year – 2018
 PFWA All-Rookie Team – 2018
 NFL Top 100: 16th (2019), 31st (2020)

NFL records
 Most 100+ yards from scrimmage games by a rookie – 12 games
 Most 50+ yard touchdowns by a rookie – 5 (tied with Randy Moss)
 Most receptions by a rookie running back – 91
 Most catches in a game by a rookie – 14

Giants franchise records
 Most rushing touchdowns in a season by a rookie – 11
 Most rushing yards in a season by a rookie – 1,307
 Most total touchdowns in a season by a rookie – 15
 Most catches in a game by a rookie – 14 
 First Giants' running back to have 1,000 rush yards in first two seasons

Personal life
Barkley is the son of Alibay Barkley and Tonya Johnson. He has three brothers and two sisters. His great uncle is former WBC middleweight champion Iran Barkley. Barkley has two children. His daughter, Jada Clare, was born April 24, 2018. Barkley’s son, Saquon Jr., was born in September 2022.

In 2018, the Government of Pennsylvania voted in favor of making March 14 a state holiday known as "Saquon Barkley Day". Barkley and his family participated in a parade through his hometown of Coplay, Pennsylvania that included the Whitehall High School marching band and kids from the league where Barkley played youth football.

Barkley is a Christian.

See also 

 List of New York Giants first-round draft picks
 List of National Football League records (individual)

References

External links

 
 
 New York Giants bio
 Penn State Nittany Lions bio

1997 births
Living people
21st-century African-American sportspeople
African-American players of American football
All-American college football players
American football running backs
Ed Block Courage Award recipients
National Conference Pro Bowl players
National Football League Offensive Rookie of the Year Award winners
New York Giants players
Penn State Nittany Lions football players
Players of American football from Pennsylvania
Sportspeople from Lehigh County, Pennsylvania
Sportspeople from the Bronx
Players of American football from New York City
Whitehall High School (Pennsylvania) alumni